Joseph Burr Tyrrell Elementary School is an elementary school in Fort Smith, Northwest Territories, Canada and is named for Joseph Tyrrell. The school is overseen by the Fort Smith District Education Authority and administered by the South Slave Divisional Education Council. It provides elementary education services to students from Fort Smith as well as the nearby Salt River First Nation and Smith's Landing First Nation.

Background
As of 2020, the school had 249 students and 28 staff members. The number of students tends to shift significantly from year-to-year due to the large number of students from outside the community whose parents attend nearby Aurora College, Thebacha Campus for a limited time. One estimate indicated that student turnover at the school could be as high as fifty percent. The school is located in the South Slave Region and is administered by the South Slave Divisional Education Council, alongside other schools in the communities of Hay River, Fort Resolution, Lutselk'e, and Kátlodéhche First Nation (Hay River Reserve).

The school was named after Joseph Burr Tyrrell, a geologist and cartographer from Weston, Ontario responsible for leading two expeditions into what is now referred to as the Barren Lands in the Northwest Territories.

French Immersion Program

The school is, as of 2012, hosting a French Immersion program being offered to students from grades one to six.

References

Elementary schools in the Northwest Territories